Ndokoa Gorge is a gorge in New Caledonia.

References

External links
View on Google Earth

Geography of New Caledonia